181st Street station may refer to:
 181st Street (IND Eighth Avenue Line), a station on the IND Eighth Avenue Line
 181st Street (IRT Broadway–Seventh Avenue Line), a station on the IRT Broadway–Seventh Avenue Line